Iain MacCormick (1917–1966) was a Scottish-Australian writer. He wrote for British TV in the 1950s and 1960s and a number of his works were adapted for Australian TV.

He was a POW for four years during World War II.

Select Credits
A Beautiful World (1949) - play
The Small Victory (1954)
Act of Violence (1956) - TV play
Marjolaine (1957)
The Sound of Thunder (1957)
The Small Victory (1958) - TV movie
The Uninvited (1958)
The Money Man (1958) - TV series
One Morning Near Troodos (1959) - TV movie
The Hunted (1961)
Nightfall at Kriekville (1961)

References

External links
Biography at British Television Drama
Iain MacCormick at AustLit

Australian writers
1917 births
1965 deaths
World War II prisoners of war held by Germany
Australian prisoners of war
Australian people of Scottish descent
Australian Army personnel of World War II
Australian Army officers
Australian emigrants to the United Kingdom